Henry Compton, 1st Baron Compton (14 July 1544 – 10 December 1589), was an English peer and Member of Parliament.

Compton was the posthumous son of Peter Compton of Compton Wynyates and his wife Anne, daughter of George Talbot, 4th Earl of Shrewsbury, and the grandson of Sir William Compton. He was trained in the law at Gray's Inn (1563). He succeeded his father in 1544 and was knighted in 1567.

He was elected a Member (MP) of the Parliament of England for Old Sarum in 1563 and was appointed High Sheriff of Warwickshire for 1571–1572. In 1572, he was summoned to the House of Lords as Baron Compton, of Compton in the County of Warwick. After his ennoblement, Lord Compton was one of the peers at the trial of Mary, Queen of Scots, in 1586.

He married, firstly, Frances, daughter of Francis Hastings, 2nd Earl of Huntingdon, and Katherine Pole, with whom he had one son. He married, secondly, Anne, daughter of Sir John Spencer and Katherine Kitson, with whom he had a further two sons. Lord Compton died in December 1589, aged 45, and was succeeded in the barony by his son from his first marriage, William, who was created Earl of Northampton in 1618. A younger son, Thomas, was the third husband of Mary Villiers, Countess of Buckingham, mother of the great royal favourite George Villiers, 1st Duke of Buckingham.

Notes

References
 
 
 
 Kidd, Charles, Williamson, David (editors). Debrett's Peerage and Baronetage (1990 edition). New York: St Martin's Press, 1990, 

1544 births
1589 deaths
Members of Gray's Inn
01
H
English MPs 1563–1567
High Sheriffs of Warwickshire
16th-century English nobility
Sheriffs of Warwickshire
Peers of England created by Elizabeth I